Shinji Sasaoka (佐々岡 真司, born August 26, 1967 in Naka District, Shimane, Japan) is a former Nippon Professional Baseball pitcher.

External links

1967 births
Living people
Baseball people from Shimane Prefecture
Japanese baseball players
Nippon Professional Baseball pitchers
Hiroshima Toyo Carp players
Nippon Professional Baseball MVP Award winners
Managers of baseball teams in Japan
Hiroshima Toyo Carp managers